Yel Cheshmeh-ye Olya (also Romanized as Yel Cheshmeh-ye ‘Olyā; also known as Yel Cheshmeh-ye Bālā) is a village in Zavkuh Rural District, Pishkamar District, Kalaleh County, Golestan Province, Iran. At the 2006 census, its population was 1,072, in 198 families.

References 

Populated places in Kalaleh County